This article lists census-designated places (CDPs) in the U.S. state of Maine. As of 2018, there were a total of 106 census-designated places in Maine, down from 109 during the 2010 Census. The CDPs of Sanford, South Sanford, and Springvale incorporated into the city of Sanford in 2013.

Census-Designated Places

References

See also
List of places in Maine

 
Census-designated places
Maine